The Conygar Tower in Dunster, Somerset, England was built in 1775 and has been designated as a Grade II listed building.

It is a circular, 3 storey folly tower built of red sandstone, situated on a hill overlooking the village. There is no evidence that it ever had floors or a roof.

The name Conygar comes from two medieval words Coney meaning rabbit and Garth meaning garden, indicating that it was once a warren where rabbits were bred for food.

In 1997 a survey carried out by The Crown Estate identified cracks in the walls which were repaired in 2000.

References

Towers completed in 1775
Grade II listed buildings in West Somerset
West Somerset
History of Somerset
Folly towers in England
Towers in Somerset
Listed towers in the United Kingdom